Peter I: The Last Tsar and the First Emperor is a 2022 Russian historical documentary film directed by Andrei Kravchuk about the fate of one of the brightest Russian rulers, who forever rewrote the history of the country.

It was released on November 3, 2022, by Central Partnership.

Plot 
The film will tell about the formation and reign of Peter the Great, about how, without a professional army and navy, he managed to pave the way to the sea and turned backward Russia into an empire.

Cast 
 Ivan Kolesnikov as Tsar and Emperor Peter I
  as Peter in his youth
 Daniil Muravyev-Izotov as Peter in childhood
 Wolfgang Cerny as François Le Fort
 Igor Gordin as Menshikov
 Maksim Ivanov as Menshikov in his youth
 Kseniya Utekihina as Catherine I of Russia
 Anastasiya Mishina as Sophia Alekseyevna of Russia
 Yuliya Bocharova as Natalya Naryshkina
 Roman Konoplev as Ivan Alekseyevich
 Aleksandr Bolshakov as Patriarch Joachim of Moscow
 Aleksandr Vysokovsky as Ivan Tsykler
 Aleksandr Klyukvin as Fyodor Romodanovsky
 Valentin Stasyuk as Aleksei Shein
 Vasily Michkov as Artamon Matveyev

Release 
The premiere of the tape is scheduled for November 3, 2022. The release of the project is dedicated to the 350th anniversary of Peter the Great. The film can be seen in Russian cinemas.

References

External links 
 

2022 films
2020s historical films
2022 documentary films
2020s Russian-language films
Russian historical films
Films set in Russia
Russian documentary films
Docudrama films
Biographical films about Russian royalty
Cultural depictions of Peter the Great